The 1910 North Dakota gubernatorial election was held on November 8, 1910. Incumbent Democrat John Burke defeated Republican nominee C. A. Johnson with 49.96% of the vote.

Primary elections
Primary elections were held on June 29, 1910.

Democratic primary

Candidates
John Burke, incumbent Governor

Results

Republican primary

Candidates
C. A. Johnson
J. A. Buchanan
Hans H. Aaker
George W. Wilson
Smith Stimmel

Results

General election

Candidates
Major party candidates
John Burke, Democratic
C. A. Johnson, Republican

Other candidates
I. S. Lampman, Socialist

Results

County results 
Results by county were as follows.

References 

1910
North Dakota
Gubernatorial